Metopides paradoxus is a species of beetle in the family Cerambycidae. It was described by Karl-Ernst Hüdepohl in 1992. It is known from Sulawesi, Borneo and Malaysia.

References

Lamiini
Beetles described in 1992